Miniphasma prima is a species of phasmid or stick insect of the genus Miniphasma. It is found in Sri Lanka. It was first described from Horton Plains.

References

Phasmatodea
Insects of Asia
Insects described in 1999